Three Rivers (French name:  Trois-Rivières) was an electoral district of the Legislative Assembly of the Parliament of the Province of Canada, in Canada East.  It was centered on the town of Trois-Rivières (known at that time as "Three Rivers" in English).  The district was created in 1841, based in part on the previous electoral district of the same name in the Parliament of Lower Canada.

Three Rivers electoral district was represented by one member in the Legislative Assembly.  The district was abolished in 1867, upon the creation of Canada and the province of Quebec.

Boundaries 

Three Rivers electoral district was located on the north shore of the Saint Lawrence River, midway between Quebec City and Montreal.  It was created in 1841, upon the establishment of the new Province of Canada. Although it was centered on the town of Trois-Rivières, in the same way as the predecessor electoral district of the same name for Lower Canada, its boundaries had been significantly altered by the Governor General, Lord Sydenham, to favour voters of British background over the francophone Canadiens.  Sydenham wanted to ensure members were elected who would support the new union and his government and drew the boundaries with this goal. It was an example of a linguistic and ethnic gerrymander.

The Union Act, 1840 merged the two provinces of Upper Canada and Lower Canada into the Province of Canada, with a single Parliament.  The separate parliaments of Lower Canada and Upper Canada were abolished.  The Union Act provided that the pre-existing electoral boundaries of Lower Canada and Upper Canada would continue to be used in the new Parliament, unless altered by the Union Act itself.

Three Rivers was one of the electoral districts specifically defined in the Union Act.  The Act provided that the town would continue as a separate electoral district, electing one member to the Legislative Assembly.  However, instead of continuing the district under the previous boundaries, the Act gave the Governor General the power to draw new boundaries for the district.  The Governor General exercised this power by a proclamation on March 4, 1841, only four days before the elections were to begin on March 8.

The boundaries set by the Proclamation were as follows:

The effect of these boundaries was to contract the electoral district, excluding the outlying areas of the town, which had a largely French-speaking population, thus diluting the voting strength of the francophone voters.

Members for Three Rivers (1841-1867)

Three Rivers was represented by one member in the Legislative Assembly. The following were the members for Three Rivers.
{| class="wikitable
! Colspan="2" | Members
! Party
! Election
|-

|Charles Richard OgdenTory Party1841

|Edward GreiveTory Party1844

|Joseph-Édouard Turcotte Moderate Reformer1845

|NoneN/A1848

|Antoine PoletteModerate Reformer1848

|Antoine PoletteModerate Reformer1851

|Antoine PoletteParti bleu1854

|William McDonell DawsonTory Party1858

|Joseph-Édouard TurcotteParti bleu1861

|Joseph-Édouard TurcotteParti bleu1863

|Louis-Charles Boucher de NivervilleParti bleu1865
|}

Abolition 

The district was abolished on July 1, 1867, when the British North America Act, 1867 came into force, creating Canada and splitting the Province of Canada into Quebec and Ontario.  It was succeeded by electoral districts of the same name in the House of Commons of Canada and the Legislative Assembly of Quebec.

References

See also
 List of elections in the Province of Canada

Electoral districts of Canada East